West v Secretary of State for Scotland 1992 SC 385 (IH), 1992 SLT 636, (also reported as West v Scottish Prison Service, 1992 SCLR 504) is the leading case on judicial review in Scotland and sets out in detail the present law. It sets a contrast to the position on judicial review in English law.

The petitioner complained that on being moved from his employment at one prison to another, he had been told that his moving expenses would be paid, but that they were not. The respondent said that the terms of his employment were that he was to be mobile, and that as a Crown employee his terms of employment were variable at the instance of the crown. 
Held: Wherever there is an excess or abuse of the power or jurisdiction which has been conferred on a decision-maker, the Court of Session has the power to correct it.

Judgment
The Court of Session held that does not require that the decision complained should have any public law element in order to be reviewable:

… the Court of Session has power, in the exercise of its supervisory jurisdiction, to regulate the process by which decisions are taken by any person or body to whom a jurisdiction, power or authority has been delegated or entrusted by statute, agreement or any other instrument 

The public or private nature of the inferior body or tribunal is not decisive, nor is it necessary to enquire whether the decision of the inferior body or tribunal is administrative in character. The essential point is that a decision-making function has been entrusted to that body or tribunal which it can be compelled by the court to perform… The essential feature of all these cases is the conferring, whether by statute or private contract, of a decision-making power or duty on a third party to whom the taking of the decision is entrusted but whose manner of decision-making may be controlled by the court.[per Lord President Hope at page 650, emphasis added].

Crucially, in Scots administrative law the competency of an application to the supervisory jurisdiction

… does not depend upon any distinction between public law and private law, nor is it confined to those cases which English law has accepted as amenable to judicial review...

Significance
The law of Scotland is different from the law of England on this matter: see, for England, R v Chief Rabbi of the United Hebrew Congregations of Great Britain ex parte Wachmann in which Simon Brown J held that a decision of the Chief Rabbi to terminate a rabbi's employment was not reviewable: to attract the court's supervisory jurisdiction, there must be ‘not merely a public but potentially a governmental interest in the decision-making power in question.’ [at page 1046, emphasis added].

See also
UK constitutional law
UK administrative law

Notes

1992 in case law
1992 in Scotland
Court of Session cases
United Kingdom administrative case law
1992 in British law